The Saxon Mill is a former mill at Guy's Cliffe, Warwickshire, England, situated about one mile northeast of the town of Warwick. It is now a restaurant and bar. It is on the River Avon and it has a water wheel, although a larger waterwheel has gone. At the rear of the mill, there is a pedestrian footbridge and weir crossing the River Avon towards Old Milverton. The building has been designated as a Grade II listed building on the National Heritage List for England since 1951.

History

The mill was originally called Gibbeclive Mill in the 12th century. It was the property of St Mary's Abbey, Kenilworth and the Augustinian canons until the Dissolution of the Monasteries. It was rebuilt in 1822. It was a working mill until 1938, and it was converted into a restaurant and bar in 1952.
, the restaurant has a glass window cut-away in the floor where the water can be seen flowing under the building.

Places nearby
 Old Milverton
 Milverton
 Leek Wootton
 River Leam

References
The History of Guy's Cliffe
National Heritage List for England Entry

External links
Official website

Buildings and structures in Warwickshire